Rafaela Andrade de Moraes (born 23 May 1981), commonly known as Rafaela, is a Brazilian women's international footballer who plays as a midfielder. She is a member of the Brazil women's national football team. She was part of the team at the 2003 FIFA Women's World Cup.

References

1981 births
Living people
Brazilian women's footballers
Brazil women's international footballers
Place of birth missing (living people)
2003 FIFA Women's World Cup players
Women's association football midfielders